Bankes may refer to
Bankes (surname)
Bankes Coffee Stores, a chain of stores operated in Chicago area in the U.S. in the early 20th century
Bankes's Horse, (c.1586–c.1606), English performing horse

See also
Banks (disambiguation)